The Christian Israelite Church was founded in 1822 by John Wroe.

History

From 1822 to 1831, the church had its headquarters in the town of Ashton-under-Lyne, Lancashire, United Kingdom, which the church wanted to turn into a "new Jerusalem". Wroe's followers intended to build a wall around the town with four gateways. The wall was never constructed, but the four gatehouses were, as was a printing press. Popular opinion in Ashton-under-Lyne turned against Wroe when he was accused of indecent behaviour in 1831, but the charges were dismissed. The Church spread to Australia and the United States, where it is still active.

Beliefs

The church also believes there will be two resurrections. During the first one, everyone will resurrect, but only those who observed the Law of Moses - apart from the sacrificial laws - in conjunction with the Gospel commands and precepts, would attain salvation. On the other hand, the wicked and unrepentant would die a second death, get punished during a Millennial period of a thousand years before they would resurrect for a second time to also receive salvation, but enjoy a lesser degree of spiritual life and happiness.

References

External links

 Christian Israelite Church (Official website)

1822 establishments in the United Kingdom
Adventism
Christian denominations established in the 19th century
Christian denominations in Australia
Fundamentalist denominations
Religious organizations established in 1822